Sharpe's Assassin is the twenty-first historical novel in the Richard Sharpe series by Bernard Cornwell, published in 2021. The story is set in June 1815, immediately after the Battle of Waterloo, and during the occupation of Paris.

Plot summary
Lieutenant-Colonel Richard Sharpe, in command of the Prince of Wales' Own Volunteers, is tasked by the Duke of Wellington to precede the main British army into France and rescue a high-value prisoner from the citadel in the commune of Ham.

Accompanied by his friend, retired Sergeant Major Patrick Harper and exploring officer Major Vincent, Sharpe uses a ruse de guerre to gain access to and capture the fortress. They rescue the prisoner, an art dealer and British spy named Alan Fox. Sharpe executes via guillotine the citadel's commandant as punishment for the murder of several of the other prisoners.

Upon returning to the army, Sharpe is appalled to find that the newly arrived Major Charles Morris, who had Sharpe flogged in India, has been given command of his battalion due to a shortage of experienced officers. After threatening to flog Morris if he flogs any of the men during his absence, Sharpe is dispatched with Fox to Paris with Harper, Charlie Weller, and some picked men to investigate a rumoured plot by a Bonapartist cabal calling themselves La Fraternité to assassinate Wellington, Prince Blücher, Louis XVIII, and other allied leaders. Despite Fox's insistence on secrecy, Sharpe informs his lover, Lucille Castineau, of his mission; she passes on a request from her host, the Dowager Countess of Maubeuges, to evict a group of deserters who have occupied her Parisian mansion.

After arriving in Paris and setting up a hideout in Fox's art warehouse, Sharpe and Fox meet with Fox's informant, Felix Collignon, who springs an ambush. With the aid of Harper and his men, Sharpe captures Collignon, and, after Fox has interrogated him, kills him. Collingnon had given up two names — General Delaunay and Colonel Lanier — and leaves to find and question one of the men alone, over Sharpe's objections. When Fox does not return, Sharpe presumes he has been captured. Fearing that the warehouse is known to La Fraternité, he takes his men to the dowager countess's mansion and attacks in the middle of the night, killing some deserters and evicting the survivors. The next day, Sharpe sees French troops raid the warehouse, confirming his fears.

Sharpe learns that the Delaunay family owns a vineyard on the outskirts of Paris, and that evening takes his men to investigate. After sneaking into the Delaunay home through an open window, Sharpe finds himself held at gunpoint by Madame Delaunay, the general's English wife, who informs him that her husband had been killed at Waterloo, and that Fox is her captive. She expresses curiosity about Sharpe's rifle and test-fires it out of the window, but the recoil injures her, and Sharpe easily disarms her. His men overpower the guards.

Sharpe questions Madame Delaunay, who confesses that La Fraternité was formed by her husband from loyalist soldiers to avenge Napoleon if he were killed in battle. The freed Fox dismisses it as "medieval claptrap" that likely died with the general, though Sharpe believes otherwise. Sharpe and his men withdraw under fire back to the Maubeuges mansion. Sharpe returns with Harper to the vineyard the next morning and discovers an entire infantry battalion stationed there, commanded by Colonel Lanier, nicknamed "Le Monstre" ("the Monster") by his men.

Several days later, the allied armies march into Paris, freeing Fox to return to his official duty of cataloguing and returning to its original owners art in the Louvre stolen by the French. Wellington is unconvinced of Sharpe's claim that Lanier is hiding troops in the Delaunay vineyard after a search finds nothing, but after failed attempts on Sharpe and Wellington's lives by Lanier's men, he orders an attack on the Delaunay vineyard. Despite everything, Sharpe grudgingly confesses to himself a liking and respect for the French colonel after coming face-to-face with him during one of the foiled assassination attempts.

Sharpe leads the light company through a smuggling tunnel from a nearby tavern into the Delauany house but is wounded in the shoulder. Three Prussian companies assist the South Essex in a frontal attack on the house and warehouse through the vineyard, but Morris holds the South Essex back. After a fight inside the Delaunay house which leaves it ablaze, Sharpe eventually re-joins his men and turns the tide of battle. Lanier challenges Sharpe to single combat, with the stipulation that the loser's troops withdraw. Sharpe agrees, but then orders Morris to take his place, as he is wounded. When Morris refuses, Sharpe has him arrested for cowardice in the face of the enemy, then accepts Lanier's challenge. In the ensuing duel, Lanier uses his superior fencing skills to further wound Sharpe, but rather than kill him, instead gives Sharpe the opportunity to yield. Sharpe instead resorts to "gutter fighting", breaking Lanier's sword arm and forcing him to yield. Lanier confirms that he is the last member of La Fraternité, and is allowed to peacefully depart from Paris with his men.

Later, Morris resigns his commission in disgrace rather than face a court martial, and Wellington confirms Sharpe's promotion to lieutenant-colonel, but expresses his surprise at Sharpe's decision to retire and hand command of the battalion to Peter D'Alembord, though Sharpe agrees to return to service in the future should Britain need him. Wellington then asks Sharpe if he had meant to kill or merely wound the Prince of Orange at the Battle of Waterloo. Sharpe admits that he tried to kill the Prince, to which Wellington approvingly responds that it was "a damn fine miss."

One year later, Sharpe, peacefully retired to his and Lucille's farm in Normandy, receives a letter from Harper informing him of the birth of his son, Richard. He and Lucille agree that they must visit Ireland, so their son and Harper's may meet.

Publication history
 2021, UK, HarperCollins , 30 September 2021, Hardback
 2021, USA, Harper , 7 December 2021, Hardback

References

Notes 

2021 British novels
Assassin
Fiction set in 1815
Novels set in the 1810s
Peninsular War